Golestan Rural District is a rural district (dehestan) in Loveh District, Galikash County, Golestan Province, Iran. The seat of the rural district is Tangrah.

References 

Rural Districts of Golestan Province
Galikash County